State Route 211 is a state route in Utah that is an access road for Newspaper Rock State Historic Monument and the Needles district of Canyonlands National Park. The entire length of the highway has been designated the Indian Creek Corridor Scenic Byway.

Route description
The highway begins near Church Rock, a notable rock formation along U.S. Route 191 between Moab and Monticello. It runs past the ruins of the utopian religious community called Home of Truth, and through Photograph Gap. The highway then descends Indian Canyon. Once exiting the canyon the highway passes by Newspaper Rock, directly off the shoulder of the highway. The highway also passes by Sixshooter Peaks, notable peaks near the entrance to Canyonlands National Park. The highway ends at Dugout Ranch just shy of the National Park boundary.

The descent down Indian Canyon between US-191 and Newspaper Rock features a steep descent and sharp curves.

History
In 1968, the Utah State Road Commission came to an agreement with the National Park Service and San Juan County to improve the then-unpaved access road to the Needles district of Canyonlands National Park. The roadway left SR-9 (US-160, now US-191) near Church Rock and went southwest to near Newspaper Rock and northwest via Dugout Ranch to the park. SR-211 was deleted in 1969, but restored in 1971. After construction was complete, the portion between SR-9 and Dugout Ranch was designated SR-211. The rest from Dugout Ranch to the park boundary remained a county road.

Flooding caused by heavy rains destroyed a large part of the road on August 14, 2022. The road was reopened on September 26, 2022.

Major intersections

References

211
211
 211